Miguel Crespo da Silva (born 11 September 1996) is a Portuguese professional footballer who plays for Turkish club Fenerbahçe as a midfielder.

Club career

Braga
Born in Lyon, France to Portuguese parents, Crespo spent his first four seasons as a senior in lower league or amateur football. On 12 June 2017 he signed with S.C. Braga, being assigned to the reserve side in the LigaPro.

Crespo made his debut as a professional on 19 August 2017, starting in a 0–2 home loss against C.D. Santa Clara. He scored his first goal in the league later that month, in the 2–2 home draw with Leixões SC.

Estoril
Crespo joined fellow second-tier club G.D. Estoril Praia in July 2019, agreeing to a three-year contract. First choice from 2020–21 onwards, he scored six goals in all competitions during the campaign as his team returned to the Primeira Liga after three years as champions.

On 13 August 2021, Crespo played his first match in the Portuguese top division, a 0–0 home draw against Vitória de Guimarães. He scored for the first time two weeks later, opening the 2–1 win over C.S. Marítimo also at the Estádio António Coimbra da Mota.

Fenerbahçe
Crespo moved to Fenerbahçe S.K. of the Turkish Süper Lig on a three-year deal on 6 September 2021, with the possibility of a one-year extension.

Career statistics

Club

Honours
Estoril
Liga Portugal 2: 2020–21

References

External links

1996 births
Living people
French people of Portuguese descent
Portuguese footballers
Footballers from Lyon
Association football midfielders
Primeira Liga players
Liga Portugal 2 players
Campeonato de Portugal (league) players
Merelinense F.C. players
S.C. Braga B players
G.D. Estoril Praia players
Süper Lig players
Fenerbahçe S.K. footballers
Portuguese expatriate footballers
Expatriate footballers in Turkey
Portuguese expatriate sportspeople in Turkey